is a railway station in the city of Katagami, Akita Prefecture, Japan, operated by East Japan Railway Company (JR East).

Lines

Station layout
Tennō Station has one side platform, serving a single bidirectional traffic. The station is unattended.

History
Tennō Station opened on November 26, 1956 as a station on the Japan National Railways (JNR),  serving the town of Tennō, Akita. With the privatization of JNR on April 1, 1987, the station has been managed by JR East.

Surrounding area
 
Toko Elementary School

See also
 List of Railway Stations in Japan

External links
JR East station information page 

Railway stations in Japan opened in 1956
Railway stations in Akita Prefecture
Oga Line
Katagami, Akita